Michal Makovský (born 6 April 1976) is a former Czech motorcycle speedway rider who started in 2000 Speedway Grand Prix of Czech Republic and 2001 Speedway World Cup.

Speedway Grand Prix results

Career details

World Championships 

 Individual World Championship (Speedway Grand Prix)
 2000 - 32nd place (1 pt in one event)
 Team World Championship (Speedway World Team Cup and Speedway World Cup)
 1999 -  Pardubice - Runner-up (8 pts)
 2001 -  - 7th place
 Individual U-21 World Championship
 1996 -  Olching - 7th place (8 pts)
 1997 -  Mšeno - 8th place (8 pts)

European Championships 

 European Club Champions' Cup
 2000 -  Piła - 4th place (4 pts) for Pardubice

Domestic competitions 

 Team Polish Championship (League)
 1998 - 6th place in Second League for Rawicz (Average 2.000)
 1999 - 8th place in Second League for Rawicz (Average 1.886)
 2000 - 2nd place in Second League for Tarnów (Average 2.366)

See also 
 Czech Republic national speedway team
 List of Speedway Grand Prix riders

References 

Czech speedway riders
Sportspeople from Hradec Králové
1976 births
Living people